József Örmény (born 1960 in Uzhhorod, Ukraine) is a Ukrainian pianist of Hungarian origin. He is mostly known for performing 20th-century music including Olivier Messiaen, Karlheinz Stockhausen, Alfred Schnittke and Ukrainian composers Yevhen Stankovych, Valentin Silvestrov, and others. He was also in close creative relationship with the Polish composer Andrzej Nikodemowicz, who wrote five of his piano concerti for Örmény.

Early life
József Örmény was educated in Lviv Conservatory (professor: Maria Krushelnytska) and afterwards in Moscow Conservatory (professor: Yevgeny Malinin).

Career
Today he is a professor in Lviv Conservatory and an active piano performer.

Notes

1960 births
Living people
Musicians from Uzhhorod
Ukrainian pianists
21st-century pianists